The Christopher Columbus Quincentenary commemorative coins are a series of commemorative coins which were issued by the United States Mint in 1992 for the Columbus Quincentenary.

Legislation 
The Christopher Columbus Quincentenary Coin Act authorized the production of three coins, a clad half dollar, a silver dollar, and a gold half eagle, to commemorate the 500th anniversary of Christopher Columbus' discovery of America.  The act allowed the coins to be struck in both proof and uncirculated finishes. The coins were first released on August 28, 1992.

Designs

Half Dollar

The obverse of the Christopher Columbus Quincentennary half dollar, designed by T. James Ferrell, features a full-body image of Christopher Columbus at landfall, arms outstretched, with his disembarking crew and a small boat behind him to his right, and a ship in the background to his left. The reverse, also designed by Ferrell, portrays Columbus' ships the Niña, Pinta, and Santa María.

Obverse (left) and reverse (right) of the half dollar

Dollar
The obverse of the Christopher Columbus Quincentennary dollar, designed by John Mercanti, features a full-body image of Christopher Columbus holding a banner in his right hand, a scroll in his left hand, and standing next to a globe atop a pedestal to his left. The reverse, designed by Thomas D. Rogers, features an image of the left half of  the Santa Maria and the right half the U.S. Space Shuttle Discovery, along with the Earth and a star to the upper right of the shuttle.

Obverse (left) and reverse (right) of the dollar

Half eagle
The obverse of the Christopher Columbus Quincentennary half eagle, designed by T. James Ferrell, shows Columbus facing a map of the Americas. The reverse, designed by Thomas D. Rogers, features the crest of the Admiral of the Oceans, an honor that was bestowed upon Columbus, and a map overlapping the Old World with the date 1492.

Obverse (left) and reverse (right) of the half eagle

Specifications 
Half Dollar
 Display Box Color: Dark Green
 Edge: Reeded
 Weight: 11.34 grams
 Diameter: 30.61 millimeters; 1.205 inches
 Composition: 92% Copper, 8% Nickel
 Maximum Mintage: 6,000,000

Dollar
 Display Box Color: Dark Green
 Edge: Reeded
 Weight: 26.730 grams; 0.8594 troy ounce
 Diameter: 38.10 millimeters; 1.50 inches
 Composition: 90% Silver, 10% Copper
 Maximum Mintage: 4,000,000

Half Eagle
 Display Box Color: Dark Green
 Edge: Reeded
 Weight: 8.359 grams; 0.2687 troy ounce
 Diameter: 21.59 millimeters; 0.850 inch
 Composition: 90% Gold, 6% Silver, 4% Copper
 Maximum Mintage: 500,000

See also

 
 
 United States commemorative coins
 List of United States commemorative coins and medals (1990s)
 Columbian half dollar

References

Modern United States commemorative coins
Gold coins
Silver coins